Matteo Fabbro (born 10 April 1995 in Udine) is an Italian cyclist, who currently rides for UCI WorldTeam . In August 2019, he was named in the startlist for the 2019 Vuelta a España. In October 2020, he was named in the startlist for the 2020 Giro d'Italia.

Major results

2015
 4th Gran Premio Sportivi di Poggiana
2016
 3rd Overall Tour of Bihor
 5th Trofeo Città di San Vendemiano
 6th Overall Tour of Malopolska
2017
 1st Prologue Giro della Valle d'Aosta
 3rd Overall Giro del Belvedere
 5th Gran Premio Sportivi di Poggiana
 9th Coppa Collecchio
2018
 8th Overall Tour of Turkey
2019
 5th Trofeo Matteotti
2021 
 5th Overall Tirreno–Adriatico

Grand Tour general classification results timeline

References

External links

1995 births
Living people
Italian male cyclists
Sportspeople from Udine
Cyclists from Friuli Venezia Giulia